Sara Ziff is an American fashion model, filmmaker, and labor activist. She is the founder and executive director of the Model Alliance, a nonprofit organization in New York City.

Early life and education 

Sara Ziff was born and raised in New York City. Ziff attended the Bronx High School of Science and the Dalton School. Ziff graduated with a B.A. in Political Sciences, magna cum laude from Columbia University, and she earned her M.P.A. at Harvard Kennedy School.

Modeling career 

Ziff has appeared as the face of advertising campaigns for companies including Tommy Hilfiger, Kenzo, Stella McCartney, and Kenneth Cole. She has walked in runway fashion shows for brands such as Prada, Chanel, Christian Dior, Calvin Klein, Marc Jacobs, Dolce & Gabbana, Dries Van Noten, Balenciaga, Chloé and Alexander McQueen.

Filmmaking and writing 

With her co-director Ole Schell, Ziff chronicled her modeling journey in the award-winning documentary Picture Me. The film gives an inside look into the modeling industry, showing the highs and lows of a seemingly glamorous business. After Picture Me, Ziff directed a three-part web mini-series for the modeling blog of New York Magazine, "The Cut". In 2014, Ziff released the preview of "Tangled Thread," a documentary about Bangladesh's garment industry and women organizing for better working conditions across the supply chain.

She has contributed as an op-ed columnist for The New York Times, Equal Times, and The Guardian.

Activism 
Ziff is an advocate for better working conditions in the modeling industry, which she has described as "an overlooked frontier of women's rights and workers' rights." In 2012, she formed the Model Alliance, a non-profit organization that advocates for fair labor standards for models working in the American fashion industry. In 2013, under Ziff's leadership, the Model Alliance championed the Child Model Act in New York State, which reclassified models under 18 as child performers and extended them basic labor protections, including provisions for educational requirements, maximum working hours, and trust accounts. New York Magazine declared her "the Norma Rae of the runway" and the AFL–CIO called her "America's next top role model."

In 2012, Ziff became involved with Save the Children, a non-governmental organization that promotes children's rights, provides relief and helps support children in developing countries. At the United Nations, Ziff introduced the organization's global flagship report, "A Life Free From Hunger – Tackling Childhood Malnutrition."

In 2012, Ziff began campaigning for better working conditions for garment workers in Bangladesh. In September 2013, she joined other fashion models and labor rights activists at New York Fashion Week to encourage Nautica to sign the Accord on Fire and Building Safety in Bangladesh.

Awards 
In 2012, Ziff was honored by the blog Jezebel as one of "The Jezebel 25," a group of "game-changing women" who embody the site's feminist ideals.

In 2013, Ziff was awarded the Susan B. Anthony award by the National Organization for Women for her dedication to improving the lives of young women and girls in New York City.

In 2014, Ziff was awarded the 1st Inspiration and Visionary award by the Women & Fashion Film Festival for her leadership and work empowering women and girls in the fashion industry.

References

External links 
 Sara Ziff Video produced by Makers: Women Who Make America

Living people
1983 births
Female models from New York (state)
American documentary filmmakers
Models from New York City
Columbia University School of General Studies alumni
Dalton School alumni
The Bronx High School of Science alumni
Workers' rights activists
American women's rights activists
American women documentary filmmakers
Harvard Kennedy School alumni
People from Greenwich Village
21st-century American women